The Roddy Road Covered Bridge is a small, one lane king post wooden covered bridge near Thurmont, Frederick County, Maryland.  It crosses Owen's Creek near Thurmont.  It is 40 feet long, 16 feet wide, with a 12 foot-8 inch clearance.   It was built between 1850 and 1860.

It was listed on the National Register of Historic Places in 1978.

References

External links

, including photo in 1974, at Maryland Historical Trust

Covered bridges on the National Register of Historic Places in Maryland
Wooden bridges in Maryland
Bridges in Frederick County, Maryland
Road bridges in Maryland
National Register of Historic Places in Frederick County, Maryland